Uljanik is a village in the municipality Garešnica, Bjelovar-Bilogora County in Croatia. According to the 2001 census, there are 332 inhabitants, in 113 of family households. It is connected by the D26 highway.

References 

Populated places in Bjelovar-Bilogora County